Robert Lazzarini (born September 22, 1965 in Denville, New Jersey) is an American artist who lives and works in New York City. He has been exhibited nationally and internationally since 1995 and is included in major collections such as the Hirshhorn Museum and Sculpture Garden, Washington, D.C.; the Whitney Museum of American Art, New York; and the Walker Art Center, Minneapolis.

Introduction 

Primarily a sculptor, Lazzarini is best known for making common objects that have been subjected to compound distortions which have the effect of confusing visual and haptic space, or rather complicating the space of pictures and the space of things. Lazzarini also alters the physical spaces in which these objects are seen — the "ground" to the object's "figure" — which adds to the "disorienting" effect that the work exerts on its audience.  Offering no ideal point of view and so compelling its viewers to walk around the work, Lazzarini's sculptures trace their lineage back to the 1960s, minimalism and to the introduction of phenomenology into the discourse of art. Additionally, all of Lazzarini's sculptures are created out of the same materials as the things on which they are based; for example, the skulls (2001), which Lazzarini first exhibited at the Whitney Museum of American Art, were created out of cast bone.

Work

Distortion  

The compound mathematical distortions that are central to Lazzarini's work are derived using algorithm-based operations such as mappings and translations. There are two primary types of distortions at work in Lazzarini's sculptures: planar and wave.  The planar distortions are skews and scale shifts, as well as accelerated and de-accelerated perspectives. The sine-wave distortions are compound projections of intersecting sine waves.  Particularly with regard to the planar distortions, the geometries of which are related to the construction of perspectives in two dimensions, there is no single vantage point at which the sculpture can be seen to "resolve" to the configuration of what the artist calls the "normative object" — that is, to the object upon which the sculpture is based as well as the idea of the object that resides in the viewer's mind.  Both the planar and the wave distortions make this normative object appear "alien," and so entail the viewer in a process of recognition and familiarization which has been compared to the process of human cognition.

Embodied vision 

The effect of Lazzarini's distortions is to interrupt one's standard or habituated processes of visual recognition.  The "normative object" appears familiar, but familiar to two different registers: the two-dimensional and the three-dimensional.  Such simultaneous perception of the object as both 2D and 3D one's habits of seeing, and so induces a reflex reaction, which is to walk around the object and to attempt to resolve or reconcile it to what one knows.  "Indeed the very distortions that resist and undermine our ability to see trigger a shift from the spectatorial gaze to the corporeal encounter.”  Since the object's compound distortions guarantee that no such reconciliation is possible, one's own reaction of walking around the work and taking up various vantage points, the process of attempted reconciliation itself, becomes part of the content of the work.

In staging this "corporeal encounter," then, Lazzarini's sculpture bears comparison to the early work of Robert Morris and Carl Andre, both artists associated with Minimalism, and to the mature work of Richard Serra.

Materiality 

All of Lazzarini's sculpture are fabricated out of materials that are proper to the "normative objects" upon which they are based.  What this means is that there has been no "material translation" of any kind: no working with traditional sculptural or "art" materials as a means to represent some other more complex matter, such as a human body represented in marble, or an equestrian statue cast in bronze.  The implication of this process is that it becomes difficult to describe a sculpture such as Lazzarini's brass knuckles as a "representation" of "real" brass knuckles.  The distortion of the object alone cannot render it a representation; after all, objects that are damaged or distorted via other means, such as in a fire or explosion, do not cease being the objects that they are.  Lazzarini's sculptures, in their adherence to what one might call a strict policy of material replication, open an inquiry into the nature or logic of artistic representation itself.

Repetition and variation 

Repetition and variation are formal strategies that are central to Lazzarini's sculpture.  Beginning as early as Francisco Goya's Maja paintings and reaching an apogee with Claude Monet's Rouen Cathedral series, the repetition and variation of some selected subject matter has served the history of art in many different capacities since the beginning of the nineteenth century.  It was not until the 1960s and Pop art, however, that this strategy was intentionally deployed to echo the products of media and consumer culture.  Andy Warhol's 32 Campbell Soup Cans, first exhibited at the Ferus Gallery in Los Angeles in 1962, are exemplary in this instance.  Following Warhol, but not in the Pop-vein, are figures such as Donald Judd, Sol LeWitt, and John Coplans, all of whom are important precedents for Lazzarini's work.

Thematic content 

Though Lazzarini's sculptures court the matter-of-fact to a great extent, this does not mean that they do not bear undercurrents of an often darker thematic content.  One of the artist's earliest series of works, the "studio objects" (2000), stand as shorthand representation of the artist's studio with its implications of artistic introspection and, considering the objects' distortions, suggestions of derangement and madness.  The skulls, exhibited at the Whitney in 2001, carry a host of allusions to mourning, melancholy, death and memory.  The guns, knives, and brass knuckles are more explicitly related to potential acts of violence while Lazzarini's recent print series, blood on wallpaper (2009–2010) conjures the aftermath of such acts.

Installations 

Lazzarini's installation "skulls" was first exhibited in the Whitney Museum of American Art in the 2001 exhibition, "Bitsreams," and brought the artist into wider public visibility.  The installation was made up of four sculptural variations based on a specific human skull, each mounted to one wall at eye level in an offset square room measuring fifteen by fifteen feet. Bathed in diffused fluorescent light, the shadows within the room heightened the works “image aspect” where “the walls of the gallery become a kind of uninflected visual field against which the form of each object is defined.”  The experience presented a new type of embodied viewing wherein “You feel the space around you begin to ripple, to bubble, to infold, as if it were becoming unstuck from the fixed coordinates of its three-dimensional extension. You soon become disoriented, as this ungluing of space becomes more intense.”  The intensification of the works' figure/ground relationships was brought to a new level with the installation of "guns and knives" at the Aldrich Contemporary Art Museum in Ridgefield, Connecticut, which marked the first time that Lazzarini altered the physical space of the gallery to heighten the viewer's sense of disorientation.

Awards 
 2015 Artist-in-Residence at McColl Center for Art + Innovation in Charlotte, NC.
 2005 New York Foundation for the Arts, Artist's Fellowship, Sculpture
 2003 American Academy of Arts and Letters, May 
 1986 New York Foundation for the Arts, Visual Arts Grant, June 
 1985 New York Foundation for the Arts, Visual Arts Grant, July

Public collections 
Davidson College, Davidson, North Carolina
Herbert F. Johnson Museum of Art, Cornell University, Ithaca, New York
Hirshhorn Museum and Sculpture Garden, Washington, D.C.
Hood Museum of Art, Dartmouth College, Hanover, New Hampshire
Long Beach Museum of Art, Long Beach, California
Midwest Museum of American Art, Elkhart, Indiana
Milwaukee Art Museum, Milwaukee, Wisconsin
Mint Museum of Art, Charlotte, North Carolina
The New School, New York, New York
Newark Museum, Newark, New Jersey
Saginaw Art Museum, Saginaw, Michigan
Speed Art Museum, Louisville, Kentucky
Spencer Museum of Art, University of Kansas, Lawrence, Kansas
Toledo Museum of Art, Toledo, Ohio
Utah Museum of Fine Arts, University of Utah, Salt Lake City, Utah
Virginia Museum of Fine Arts, Richmond, Virginia
Walker Art Center, Minneapolis, Minnesota
Wake Forest University, Winston-Salem, North Carolina
Whitney Museum of American Art, New York, New York

References

Bibliography 

Hansen, Mark B.N., New Philosophy for New Media (Cambridge: MIT Press, 2003)
Ravenal, John, Robert Lazzarini (Richmond: Virginia Museum of Fine Art, 2004)
Marsh, Joanna, "Looking Beyond Vision: On Phenomenology, Minimalism and the Sculptures of Robert Lazzarini" in Robert Lazzarini: Seen/Unseen (Charlotte: Mint Museum of Art, 2006)

External links
 Artist's Home Page
 Deitch Projects, NY
 Honor Fraser, LA
 DITTRICH & SCHLECHTRIEM, Berlin

1965 births
Living people
People from Denville, New Jersey
Artists from New York City